The 2011 Preakness Stakes was the 136th running of the Preakness Stakes and was won by Shackleford. The race took place on May 21, 2011, and was televised in the United States on the NBC television network. The post time was  EDT ( UTC). The race was the 12th race on a card of 13 races. The Maryland Jockey Club reported total attendance of 118,356, this is recorded as second highest on the list of American thoroughbred racing top attended events for North America in 2011.

Payout 
The 136th Preakness Stakes Payout Schedule

 $2 Exacta: (5-11) paid $114.10
 $1 Trifecta: (5-11-1) paid $700.90
 $1 Superfecta: (5-11-1-10) paid $3,106.30

The full chart 

A full field of 14 was drawn for the race. Kentucky Derby winner Animal Kingdom was installed as the 2-1 early line favorite. Also close Derby finishers Mucho Macho Man and Shackleford entered the race while Nehro, the 2nd-place finisher opted not to contest in this race.

 Winning Breeder:  Michael Lauffer and W.D. Cubbedge; (KY)   
 Final Time – 1:56.47
 Track Condition – Fast
 Total Attendance: 118,356

Running 

Shackleford held off a late charge by Animal Kingdom. Shackleford battled Flashpoint for the lead through a quick opening quarter-mile of 22.69 seconds, just a fifth of a second off the Preakness record.

Bonus Stakes 

 A $550,000 bonus was awarded to Shackleford's connections for his victory in the Preakness because of his participation in the Fountain of Youth Stakes and a top-three finish in the Florida Derby. His owners were awarded $500,000 while his trainer Dale Romans earned $50,000 in bonus money.

Notable achievements 

 First victory in a Triple Crown race for jockey Jesus Castanon and trainer Dale Romans

See also
 2011 Kentucky Derby
 2011 Belmont Stakes

References

Preakness Stakes races
Preakness Stakes
Preakness Stakes
Preakness Stakes
Horse races in Maryland